The Allman Brothers Band was an American rock band formed in Jacksonville, Florida, in 1969 by brothers Duane Allman (slide guitar and lead guitar) and Gregg Allman (vocals, keyboards, songwriting), as well as Dickey Betts (lead guitar, vocals, songwriting), Berry Oakley (bass guitar), Butch Trucks (drums), and Jai Johanny "Jaimoe" Johanson (drums). The band incorporated elements of Southern rock, blues, jazz, and country music, and their live shows featured jam band-style improvisation and instrumentals.

The group's first two studio releases stalled commercially, but their 1971 live release, At Fillmore East, represented an artistic and commercial breakthrough. The album features extended renderings of their songs "In Memory of Elizabeth Reed" and "Whipping Post", and is often considered the best live album ever made. Group leader Duane Allman was killed in a motorcycle accident later that year, and the band dedicated Eat a Peach (1972) in his memory, a dual studio/live album that cemented the band's popularity. Following the motorcycle death of bassist Berry Oakley later that year, the group recruited keyboardist Chuck Leavell and bassist Lamar Williams for 1973's Brothers and Sisters, which, combined with the hit single "Ramblin' Man", placed the group at the forefront of 1970s rock music. Internal turmoil overtook them soon after; the group dissolved in 1976, reformed briefly at the end of the decade with additional personnel changes, and dissolved again in 1982.

The band reformed once more in 1989, releasing a string of new albums and touring heavily. A series of personnel changes in the late 1990s was capped by the departure of Betts. The group found stability during the 2000s with bassist Oteil Burbridge and guitarists Warren Haynes (in his second stint with the band) and Derek Trucks (the nephew of their drummer) and became renowned for their month-long string of shows at New York City's Beacon Theatre each spring. The band retired for good in 2014. The band has been awarded seven gold and four platinum albums, and was inducted into the Rock and Roll Hall of Fame in 1995. Rolling Stone ranked them 52nd on their list of the 100 Greatest Artists of All Time in 2004.

Studio and contemporary live albums
More so than most bands, the Allman Brothers have frequently released live albums that filled the role of conventional studio albums, in that they were recently recorded and often contained new material not on any studio album, or significantly lengthened or revamped versions of studio material.  An integral part of the contemporaneous evolution of the band, such live albums are included in this section.

Retrospective live albums
Retrospective live albums are concert recordings "from the vault" that were released on CD or LP years after the actual performances.  Many of these albums feature the original lineup of the Allman Brothers Band, including Duane Allman on lead and slide guitar and Berry Oakley on bass.

Compilation albums

Videos

Singles

Music videos

"Instant Live" releases
"Instant Live" releases are albums offered at the end of various Allman concerts, recording the majority of the concert, and making an album from the sound board recording.  An example is Rosemont Theatre, Chicago, 9/01/04.

Other appearances

Live albums by recording date
Fillmore East, February 1970 – February 11–14, 1970
Live at Ludlow Garage: 1970 – April 11, 1970
Live at the Atlanta International Pop Festival: July 3 & 5, 1970 – July 3–5, 1970
American University 12/13/70 – December 13, 1970
Syria Mosque – January 17, 1971
Fillmore West '71 – January 29–31, 1971
At Fillmore East – March 12–13, 1971
Eat a Peach – March 13 – June 27, 1971
Boston Common, 8/17/71 – August 17, 1971
Live from A&R Studios – August 26, 1971
S.U.N.Y. at Stonybrook: Stonybrook, NY 9/19/71 – September 19, 1971
Down in Texas '71 – September 28, 1971
The Final Note – October 17, 1971
Macon City Auditorium: 2/11/72 – February 11, 1972
Wipe the Windows, Check the Oil, Dollar Gas – 1972–1975
Nassau Coliseum, Uniondale, NY: 5/1/73 – May 1, 1973
An Evening with the Allman Brothers Band: First Set – 1991–1992
Play All Night: Live at the Beacon Theatre 1992 – March 10–11, 1992
An Evening with the Allman Brothers Band: 2nd Set – 1992–1994
Peakin' at the Beacon – March 9–25, 2000
One Way Out – March 25–26, 2003
Cream of the Crop 2003 – July 25 – August 10, 2003
The Fox Box – September 24–26, 2004
Warner Theatre, Erie, PA 7-19-05 – July 19, 2005

Notes

References
"Discography", Hittin' the Web with the Allman Brothers Band. Retrieved March 7, 2014.
"The Allman Brothers Band Discography", AllMusic. Retrieved March 7, 2014.
"The Allman Brothers Band Discography", Discogs. Retrieved March 7, 2014.

Blues discographies
Rock music group discographies
Discographies of American artists